D1a may refer to:
Aichi D1A, a Japanese bomber plane
Haplogroup D1a, a Y-DNA haplogroup most prevalent in Japanese, Ainu, and Andamanese